The Foreign White is a color variety of the Siamese cat or Oriental Shorthair. It is considered a cat breed by the Governing Council of the Cat Fancy (GCCF) and the Australian Cat Federation (ACF). The foreign white is characterized by its long body, triangle-shaped face, uniformly white coat and deep blue eyes.

During the 1960s, the introduction of new colors in the Siamese standard resulted in the birth of fully solid colored cats. The foreign white was born from a breeding program aiming to create an all white Siamese and was recognized by the Governing Council of the Cat Fancy (GCCF) in 1977. Initially, each color of "Siamese united" became a breed, however the federations quickly understood that it was not viable to continue on such a model and merged all the united breeds into one: the Oriental Shorthair. The GCCF decided however that the foreign white was a breed in its own right. In 2022, it is the only federation with The Australian Cat Federation (ACF) to recognize its existence.

The white coat of the foreign white is induced by the W gene, the "dominant white". This gene favors the appearance of deafness in white cats with blue eyes. This breeding constraint leads foreign white breeders to systematically cross their subjects with Siamese cats and to avoid reproductions with the red colors and the tabby pattern.

Bibliographic sources 
 Dr Bruce Fogle, « Cats », Dorling Kindersley, 2006, 320 p., « European Shorthair »
 Christiane Sacase, Les Chats, Solar, coll. « Guide vert », February 1994, 256 p. 
 Desmond Morris, Cat breeds of the world : A complete illustrated encyclopedia, Ebury Press, 1996, 256 p.

Cat breeds
Cat breeds originating in England